Yuri Nikolayevich Koptev (March 13, 1940, Voroshilovsk) is a former General Director of the Russian Space Agency (Roscosmos), serving in that role from 1992 to 2004. He was replaced in 2004 by Anatoly Perminov, a former commander of the Russian Space Forces.

Beginning in 1965, he worked as an engineer at NPO Lavochkin.

Koptev is a Winner of the Golden Space Medal FAI (2000), a State Councillor of the Russian Federation, 1st class and was awarded the Order "For Merit to the Fatherland", 2nd and 3rd classes.

International sanctions
On June 28, 2022, in connection with the ongoing Russian aggression in Ukraine, he was included in the US sanctions list as a person associated with an important state-owned company for the government and the military-technical complex of the Russian Federation - Rostec and the sanction list of the United Kingdom.

References

External links
  Conversations: Daniel S. Goldin and Yuri N. Koptev; Two Professional Cold Warriors Share a Vision of Life in Space By William J. Broad, The New York Times. Published: January 16, 1994
 NASA History Division - Biographies of Aerospace Officials and Policymakers, K-N
 Date set for Mir destruction, BBC News, 16 November 2000

1940 births
Living people
20th-century Russian engineers
21st-century Russian engineers
People from Stavropol
1st class Active State Councillors of the Russian Federation
Bauman Moscow State Technical University alumni
Honoured Scientists of the Russian Federation
Laureates of the State Prize of Ukraine in Science and Technology
Recipients of the Legion of Honour
Recipients of the Order "For Merit to the Fatherland", 2nd class
Recipients of the Order "For Merit to the Fatherland", 3rd class
Recipients of the Order of Honour (Russia)
Recipients of the Order of Lenin
Recipients of the Order of Merit (Ukraine), 2nd class
Recipients of the Order of Parasat
Recipients of the Order of the Red Banner of Labour
Recipients of the USSR State Prize
State Prize of the Russian Federation laureates
Rostec
Russian mechanical engineers
Russian space program personnel
Soviet mechanical engineers